() or  is a German word with several seemingly contradictory meanings, including "to lift up", "to abolish", "cancel" or "suspend", or "to sublate". The term has also been defined as "abolish", "preserve", and "transcend". In philosophy,  is used by Hegel in his exposition of dialectics, and in this sense is translated mainly as "sublate".

(Jacques Derrida's preferred French translation of the term was relever.)

Hegel 
In Hegel, the term  has the apparently contradictory implications of both preserving and changing, and eventually advancement (the German verb  means "to cancel", "to keep" and "to pick up"). The tension between these senses suits what Hegel is trying to talk about. In sublation, a term or concept is both preserved and changed through its dialectical interplay with another term or concept. Sublation is the motor by which the dialectic functions.

Sublation can be seen at work at the most basic level of Hegel's system of logic. The two concepts Being and Nothing are each both preserved and changed through sublation in the concept Becoming. Similarly, in the Science of Logic (Doctrine of Being) determinateness, or quality, and magnitude, or quantity, are each both preserved and sublated in the concept measure.

Hegel

Hegel's philosophy of history stresses the importance of negative (the antithesis) in history—negative includes wars, etc., but not only. His conception of historical progress follows a dialectic spiral, in which the thesis is opposed by the antithesis, itself sublated by the synthesis. The synthesis both abolishes and preserves the thesis and the antithesis, an apparent contradiction which leads to difficulties in interpreting this concept (and to translate ). In Hegel's logic self-contradiction is legitimate and necessary.

For Hegel, history (like logic) proceeds in every small way through sublation. For example, the Oriental, Greek and Roman Empires (in which the individual is ignored or annihilated, then recognized, and finally suppressed by the States) are preserved and destroyed in the First French Empire, which, for Hegel, placed the individual in harmony with the State. At the level of social history, sublation can be seen at work in the master-slave dialectic.

Hegel approaches the history of philosophy in the same way, arguing that important philosophical ideas of the past are not rejected but rather preserved and changed as philosophy develops. One can always find another thing in reflective philosophy upon which some "absolute" ground relies. With Fichte's ultimate ground, the "I" or "ego", for example, one can immediately see the reliance upon the "non-I", which allows Fichte to distinguish what he means by the "I". Reflection is circular, as Fichte unapologetically acknowledged.

However, reflective thought is to be avoided due to its circularity. It leads to covering the same problems and ground ever and anon for each philosophical generation. Instead, Hegel calls on speculative thought: two contradictory elements are held together, uplifted and sublated without completely destroying one another. Speculative thought seeks to avoid the abstract idealism inherent in reflective thought and allows one to think in concrete or absolute idealisms terms about how things work, both in the present, real world and in history.

Reflexivity is, per contra -- per the pro- or positive aspects of mutual reciprocity -- undoubtedly the 'brighter' or more constructive side of Hegelian dialectics and therefore not circular (in any logically pernicious sense so 'to be avoided'). It is an informative circle rather than a logically vicious one; reentry into which undoubtedly adds depth, subtlety, richness, and nuance to personal identity via our inherent sociality of dialectical interactions one with another.

Here we have 'informed' access to consciousness's (already) reflective origins in and among the 'with' of 'unto others'; the more positive aspects of Hegel's dialectical reciprocity; that which stands in sharp contradistinction to the juxtapositionality of master/slave relations. 

Reflexivity can be informative; allowing us to re-enter the circle of consciousness in order to 'see' or become more aware, so realize and even possibly transform what makes consciousness so. Hegel's 'dialectic of consciousness' is logically no different from the 'art' of presuppositional thinking Wittgenstein attempted to bring to 'English analytic philosophy', calling attention to what is already presupposed in being a mind, having a language, sharing a culture, being in a world, etc.

On this 'foundational supposition, Aufheben is better described as 'a simultaneous breaking-down and redirecting of the energetic life-forces'; that which carries us beyond mere sublimation unto sublation. In this regard, Aufheben has, or rather carries, transcendental overtones no other word does. Never any simple 'No'; always a teleological 'perhaps'.

When 'seen' through this aspiring notion of Aufheben, the 'essence' of German idealistic philosophy shows itself deeply indebted to 'Pietistical' or transformative thought (as Hegel's thesis/antithesis/synthesis was undoubtedly inclined). Such 'speculative thought' allows us to warmly embrace and strongly endorse the history of ideas at work in consciousness or time, thereby bringing the 'Geist' of spirit in line with the psychology of self-realization and/or becoming, even self-overcoming; and this is why Hegel was both an outstanding philosopher of religion and a philosophical psychologist in one.

Marx 

Marx identifies sublation as the manner in which material, historical conditions develop. This is in stark contrast to the philosophical idealism of Hegel, for whom sublation reflects the agency of a specific  – a concept that has often been translated as "mind" or "spirit".

See also 

 Sublimation
 Thesis, antithesis, synthesis

References 

Georg Wilhelm Friedrich Hegel
Concepts in the philosophy of history